Shin Rok (born 8 July 2002) is a South Korean weightlifter. He won the gold medal in the men's 61kg event at the 2021 World Weightlifting Championships held in Tashkent, Uzbekistan.

Career 

In 2019, he won the silver medal in the men's 61kg event at the Asian Youth Championships held in Pyongyang, North Korea.

In 2021, he won the bronze medal in the snatch in the men's 61kg event at the Junior World Weightlifting Championships held in Tashkent, Uzbekistan.

Achievements

References

External links 
 

Living people
2002 births
Place of birth missing (living people)
South Korean male weightlifters
World Weightlifting Championships medalists
21st-century South Korean people